Fernando Luna Vicente (born 24 April 1958) is a former tennis player from Spain.

The right-handed achieved his highest ATP singles ranking of world No. 33 in May 1984 and finished runner-up in two Grand Prix finals during his career: Aix-En-Provence in 1984 Madrid in 1988. Luna reached the fourth round of the 1983 French Open, defeating José Luis Clerc en route.

Career finals

Singles (2 losses)

External links
 
 
 

1958 births
Living people
People from Ciudad Real
Sportspeople from the Province of Ciudad Real
Spanish male tennis players
Tennis players from Castilla–La Mancha
Mediterranean Games gold medalists for Spain
Mediterranean Games bronze medalists for Spain
Mediterranean Games medalists in tennis
Competitors at the 1979 Mediterranean Games